The Belgrade–Bar railway is a railway connecting the Serbian capital of Belgrade with the town of Bar, a major seaport in Montenegro.

Overview

Of this length,  of the railway goes through Serbia, and  through Montenegro. It is electrified with 25 kV, 50 Hz AC along the entire corridor. The longest tunnels are "Sozina", and "Zlatibor", .

The railway descends to 40m above mean sea level at Podgorica in a relatively short distance, thus the gradient of 25‰ on this section.

A small  section of the railway actually passes through Bosnia and Herzegovina, near the town of Štrpci, and three trains per day stop there in each direction (though no border police is normally present)

When the line was completed in the late 1970s, it took a train approximately seven hours to complete the trip from Belgrade to Bar. Today it takes 11 hours, due to speed restrictions, as the railway cannot safely sustain the projected speeds without being thoroughly rebuilt.

Stations

History

The decision to build the railway connection between Belgrade and Bar was made in 1952, as a national project of the Socialist Federal Republic of Yugoslavia. However, the construction was passed to the constituent Republics, SR Serbia and SR Montenegro, to build on their own.

The sections of the railway were completed as follows:
 Resnik – Vreoci in 1958
 Podgorica – Bar in 1959
 Vreoci – Valjevo in 1968
 Valjevo – Užice in 1972
 Užice – Podgorica in 1976

The construction works were concluded on 27 November 1975, by joining the railway tracks south of Kolašin. The railway was opened on 28 May 1976. Electrification was completed at the end of 1977.

Maintenance of the Belgrade–Bar railway suffered from chronic underfunding during the 1990s, which has resulted in the railway deteriorating and becoming unsafe. This culminated in the Bioče derailment, when a passenger train derailed, causing the deaths of 47 passengers. As a result, efforts are being made to thoroughly reconstruct the railway.

The Serbian part of the railway was targeted several times by NATO during its bombing campaign in 1999, seriously damaging portions of the railway. Also, the small section that passes through Bosnia and Herzegovina was blown up by SFOR ground forces. All of this damage was later repaired.

In 2016, Serbia commenced a thorough reconstruction of the entire section on its territory. The aim is to make the line able to support the maximum speed of 120 km/h as originally designed. The first section, from Belgrade to Valjevo, which represents 27% of the Serbian part of the line, was due for completion during the summer of 2017.

Gallery

See also
 Serbian Railways
 Rail transport in Montenegro
 Tito's Blue Train
 JŽ series 461 commonly operated over the Bar-Belgrade line. Based on a Swedish design.
 JŽ class 412/416 Latvian EMU
 CAF Civity EMU
 JŽ 661 Shunter/Montecargo
 JŽ 644 Shunter/Montecargo
 JŽ 744 (none of them is active) Shunter/Montecargo
 JŽ D66/761s (DB Class V 200 based engines) of Tito's Blue Train.
 JŽ 666s (EMD JT22CW-2s) of Tito's Blue Train

References

External links
 Belgrade to Bar railway, Seat 61
 The Guardian

International railway lines
Railway lines in Serbia
Railway lines in Bosnia and Herzegovina
Railway lines in Montenegro
Railway lines opened in 1958